The Nakusp was a sternwheel steamboat that operated from 1895 to 1897 on the Arrow Lakes of British Columbia.

Design and construction
Nakusp was commissioned by the Columbia and Kootenay Steam Navigation Company to replace the sternwheeler Columbia which had burned in 1894.  Capt. James W. Troup, the company's superintendent, designed Nakusp.

When launched on July 1, 1895, Nakusp was the largest steamboat that had been built on Arrow Lakes.  There were then two other sternwheelers operating on the Arrow Lakes when Nakusp was launched, Lytton and Kootenai.  Nakusp could carrying more freight than both of them combined.  At 1083 gross tons, Nakusp was over twice as large as the Columbia she was replacing.  Nakusp was also considered a luxury vessel for the time, as described by historian Downs:

Nakusp had three decks, the main or freight deck, the saloon or passenger deck, and the Texas or hurricane deck.  The freight deck could accommodate approximately 15 railroad car loads of freight, or about 300 tons.  Mechanically the vessel had a steam driven capstan and a dynamo to generate electricity for the 130 electric lights on board.  Nakusp also had two searchlights and a boom light to allow night operations.

There were 17 staterooms on the saloon deck. There were additional cabins on the Texas deck. The inside of the Texas deck included an open balcony or gallery running around and above the dining room on the saloon deck.

Operations on Arrow Lakes
By the time Nakusp was placed in operations, the Canadian Pacific Railway had completed its transcontinental line, which crossed the Columbia River at Revelstoke, BC, about 28 miles up the Columbia River from Arrowhead, which was the main town at the northern end of upper Arrow Lakes.  The stretch of the Columbia from Arrowhead to Revelstoke was difficult for steamboats to navigate, as the current was rapid and the water was often shallow.  For this reason, C.P.R. built an extension southwards towards Arrowhead, but this was placed closed to the river, and was subject to washouts during high water on the Columbia.When rail line was washed out, the northernmost departure point for Nakusp and other steamers running on the lakes reverted to Revelstoke.

Most of the passenger traffic was generated by the mines in the Kootenay region, as a contemporary source reports:

By March 1897, the Canadian Pacific Railway had repaired its extension south from the mainline at Revelstoke to Arrowhead, BC, at the northern end of the upper Arrow Lake.  At 7:00 p.m. on Mondays, Wednesdays, and Fridays, Nakusp left Arrowhead, B.C. steaming south down the lakes to Nakusp and then to Robson at the southern end of lower Arrow Lake.  Again, the correspondent of the British Columbia Mining Journal described making the connection with Nakusp on the rail extension down to Arrowhead:

Once at Robson, travelers could either ride the Columbia and Kootenay Railway up the Kootenay River to Nelson, BC and Kootenay Lake, or transfer to the smaller steamer Lytton to proceed further south down the Columbia River to Trail, BC and Northport, Washington.  (During the 1896 season, Nakusp seems to have made the run all the way to Northport as the southern terminus of her route.)  A rail line had reached Northport by this time, and traffic could proceed from there to Spokane or other points in the Pacific Northwest and the United States.

At 8:30 p.m. on Tuesdays, Thursdays, and Saturdays, Nakusp departed Robson for Nakusp and Arrowhead.  Once at Arrowhead, a traveler could transfer to the Canadian Pacific Railway, ride up the extension to Revelstoke, then board trains bound either west or east on the C.P.R.'s transcontinental line.  On each trip, Nakusp also stopped at way points on the Arrow Lakes.  Nakusp was also used to push freight barges.

Grounding on Kootenay bar
Before the area was flooded by rising water behind the Keenleyside Dam, the Kootenay River flowed into the Columbia river about 2 miles south of Robson.  The Kootenay flowed very fast and had washed a lot of sand and sediment into the Columbia, forming a shallow area called the Kootenay Bar.  On September 8, 1897, the strong current swung Nakusp out of control and on to the Kootenay Bar, where the vessel grounded.  The passengers were disembarked and the mail was ferried ashore.  The crew tried to refloat the steamboat, but these efforts failed.  The sternwheeler Kootenay arrived on the scene and picked up the passengers and the mail and took them to Robson.  Kootenay then returned to the Nakusp and tried to tow her off,  but falling water in the river frustrated this also.  Special equipment was sent down from Revelstoke, but it was not until November 1897 that vessel was refloated.  The salvage cost $7,000.

Loss by fire
On December 23, 1897, Nakusp caught fire while moored at the dock at Arrowhead.  The fire spread quickly and the vessel was a total loss.  No one was hurt, but four freight car loads of freight were already on board, and these were also destroyed.  The cause of the fire was not determined.  The sternwheeler Minto was built as a replacement for the Nakusp, although Minto was smaller and of somewhat different design, this was made up for by her sturdy steel-framed hull which allowed better operation in the winter months when ice would be on the lakes and rivers.

Notes

Further reading
 Faber, Jim, Steamer's Wake—Voyaging down the old marine highways of Puget Sound, British Columbia, and the Columbia River, Enetai Press, Seattle, WA 1985 
 Timmen, Fritz, Blow for the Landing—A Hundred Years of Steam Navigation on the Waters of the West, Caxton Printers, Caldwell, Idaho

External links

Photos
Nakusp on the Columbia River  This image gives a good idea of the large size of this sternwheeler, as well as an impression of the generally wild country that the vessel ran through in the 1890s.
Dining room aboard the Nakusp This photograph shows the high-ceiling dining room of the Nakusp and the interior galleries of the vessel overlooking the dining area.

Steamboats of the Arrow Lakes
Paddle steamers of British Columbia
1895 ships
West Kootenay
Ships of CP Ships